Chhota Katra (Small Katra) is one of two Katras built during Mughal's regime in Dhaka, Bangladesh. It was constructed in 1663 by Subahdar Shaista Khan. It is on Hakim Habibur Rahman lane on the bank of the Buriganga River. It was built to accommodate officials and Shaista Khan's expanding family. Chhota Katra is slightly smaller than Bara Katra, but similar in plan and about 185 metres east of it.

Origin

Katara is a form of cellular dormitory built around an oblong courtyard; the form originated in Persia, and like many other things Persian and middle-Asian that the Mughals introduced in this subcontinent, this was copied in Northern India, the home of some of the rulers, members of the Royal Court and the nobility. However, the term may have been derived from Arabic word Katara which meant colonnaded building, or could be a corrupt French word used for a residential quarter. Other synonyms of it are Chuttre (French) and Chatrra (Hindi), both meaning Umbrella, were used for a place that sheltered Pilgrims.

History
Chhota Katra was built in between 1663 and 1671. During the first reign of Shaista Khan, then Subahdar of Bengal and a patron of civic and religious building that gave to the architectural style appropriately named after him. It held an important place in the cityscape suggesting their prominence in the Mughal Dhaka.

Since the shift of Mughal capital in 1713, the Katra started to lose its importance along with the city, though the Naib Nazim Jissarat Khan briefly stayed here before his palace, or rather a mansion of which nothing much is now left, was built in 1765 in Nimtali in city just overcoming anarchy.

The British made some additions to the Choto Katra, once used by the first English Medium School in Dhaka (1816) set up by Padre Leonardo, and then the first normal school (1857). The Nawabs of Dhaka rented the places as a coal and lime go-down for sometime. Accounts by Charles D'oyle in 1822 testify to the beauty of the partly surviving Bara Katra, plundered by the poor inhabitants who are still there. Attempts by the archaeology department in the past to take over the structure and restore it to its original glory have been unsuccessful, mainly thwarted by the people who are running a madrasa by illegally occupying a part of the structure.

Besides this Katra, there was several more such cellular structures mainly used as inns or residential enclaves, for example Maya Katra, Muqim Katra, Nawab Katra, etc. These Katras are the few reminiscences of residential quarters in Dhaka or elsewhere in Bengal built during Mughal period.

Architecture

Exterior
The Katra is rectangular in plan, 101.20m X 92.05m externally and 81.07m X 69.19m internally. The thickness of the outer walls is 0.91m to 1.00m and the maximum thickness of the bastion walls is 1.22m. It has two gateways - to the north and south. The southern one is the main entrance. Both the gateways, though much altered recently are still in dire condition. There are also two octagonal towers in the two outer corners of the south wall of the structure.

The structures around the courtyard have undergone much renovation, reconstruction and repair. It is evident that the structure has lost much of its original given it some durability. Many modern extensions were also added to the original building. The three storied gateway on the river side has assumed some colonial features. The triple windows and the lofty angle towers reflect the colonial influence during subsequent restoration.

Interior
Inside, there is a tomb of Champa Bibi, but there is no correct history regarding her identity. There was a small mosque within its enclosure which is ruined. The one-dome square Mausoleum of Champa Bibi, a listed building now, was within its enclosure which was razed to the ground by Padre Shepherd. It was later reconstructed by the archaeologists, but is now lost within mazes of shops at Champatali. As depicted by Charles D'Oyly (who mistook the mausoleum for a mosque) it appears to have been a multi-foil saucer dome with slim corner spandrels. Champa Bibi was either Shaista Khan's daughter or a local concubine whom he later married. Shaista Khan's Bengali heirs from Champa Bibi'''s lineage used to live in Choto Katra for many years as Shaista Khan owned Katra.

See also
 List of archaeological sites in Bangladesh

References

 Mamun, Muntasir, Dhaka: Smriti Bismritir Nagari, 3rd Edition, Page No: 201–206, 
 Rahman, Mahbubbur. City of an Architect''.  Dhaka: Delvistaa Foundation. 
 
 

Old Dhaka
Tourist attractions in Dhaka
History of Dhaka
Archaeological sites in Bangladesh
Buildings and structures in Dhaka
Mughal architecture